Samuel Roger de Meester Afana (born 11 January 1982) is a retired footballer.

Career

After failing to make an appearance for Feyenoord, one of the most successful Dutch clubs, de Meester signed for Dutch second division side SBV Excelsior, where he made 32 league appearances, before joining Cercle Brugge K.S.V. in Belgium. From there, he joined Belgian lower league team KSK Malgedem.

In 2007, de Meester signed for Augsburg in the German second division, where he made 1 appearance.

In 2008, at the age of 26, he signed for German sixth division outfit TSV Gersthofen.

In 2011, he signed for Etar 1924 Veliko Tarnovo in the Bulgarian second division.

External links
 

Living people
Association football midfielders
1982 births
Dutch footballers
Excelsior Rotterdam players
FC Augsburg players
FC Etar 1924 Veliko Tarnovo players